The  was an infantry division of the Imperial Japanese Army. It was formed 28 February 1945 in Hiroshima as a square division. It was a part of the 16 simultaneously created divisions batch numbering from 140th to 160th.

Action
Initially, the 145th division was assigned to the 16th area army. Later it was reassigned to 56th army and sent to Ashiya, Fukuoka. 419th infantry regiment was defending Wakamatsu-ku, Kitakyūshū area.

The 145th division was tasked with the coastal defense. The division did not see any combat until surrender of Japan 15 August 1945.

See also
 List of Japanese Infantry Divisions

Notes and references
This article incorporates material from Japanese Wikipedia page 第145師団 (日本軍), accessed 13 July 2016
 Madej, W. Victor, Japanese Armed Forces Order of Battle, 1937–1945 [2 vols], Allentown, PA: 1981.

Japanese World War II divisions
Infantry divisions of Japan
Military units and formations established in 1945
Military units and formations disestablished in 1945
1945 establishments in Japan
1945 disestablishments in Japan